Adel Abbas Abdullah (born 24 October 1982) is a Bahraini former footballer who played as a defender for Bahrain in the 2004 AFC Asian Cup. He played club football for Riffa SC and Manama Club.

References 

Living people
Bahraini footballers
Bahrain international footballers
Association football defenders
1982 births
Manama Club players
Riffa SC players
2004 AFC Asian Cup players